There have been two baronetcies created for persons with the surname Lake, one in the Baronetage of Ireland and one in the Baronetage of Great Britain. As of 2014 one creation is extant.

The Lake Baronetcy, of Carnow in the County of Wicklow, was created in the Baronetage of Ireland on 10 July 1661 for Edward Lake, Chancellor of the Diocese of Lincoln and Advocate-General of Ireland. The title became extinct on his death in 1674.

The Lake Baronetcy, of Edmonton in the County of Middlesex, was created in the Baronetage of Great Britain on 17 October 1711 for Bibye Lake, Sub-Governor of the African Company. He was the great-nephew and heir of Sir Edward Lake of Carnow. For his services to Charles I, Sir Edward was given a warrant of a baronetcy in 1643 with a remainder to his heirs male, but the warrant was never sealed. Bibye Lake put his claim to the Earl of Oxford who decided that the grant had been lost. However, in line with what would have happened, if the warrant had been sealed, a baronetcy was conferred on Sir Edward's great-nephew and heir, Bibye Lake, and Anne, Queen of Great Britain, had a new patent issued.

The baronetcy was passed onto the eldest son for many generations, and this came to an end when Atwell King Lake, the 6th baronet, died on 15 July 1897 without having had children. James Samuel Lake, the 5th baronet, had two younger brothers whose descendants would inherit the baronetcy: Capt. Edward Lake (1807–1864) and Sir Henry Atwell Lake (1808–1881). The baronetcy was passed from the 6th baronet to St Vincent Atwell Lake, a son of his brother, St Vincent David Lake. The baronetcy was then passed to his uncle, Arthur Johnstone Lake, a son of Capt. Edward Lake. The baronetcy was then passed to his nephew, Atwell Henry Lake, a grandson of Sir Henry Atwell Lake. He was succeeded by his son, Sir (Atwell) Graham Lake, 10th Baronet (1923–2013).

Lake baronets, of Carnow (1661)
Sir Edward Lake, 1st Baronet (–1674)

Lake baronets, of Edmonton (1711)

Sir Bibye Lake, 1st Baronet (1684–1744)
Sir Atwell Lake, 2nd Baronet (1713–1760)
Sir James Winter Lake, 3rd Baronet (–1807)
Sir James Samuel William Lake, 4th Baronet (–1832)
Sir James Samuel Lake, 5th Baronet (1805–1846)
Sir Atwell King Lake, 6th Baronet (1834–1897)
Sir St Vincent Atwell Lake, 7th Baronet (1862–1916)
Sir Arthur Johnstone Lake, 8th Baronet (1849–1924)
Sir Atwell Henry Lake, 9th Baronet (1891–1972)
Sir (Atwell) Graham Lake, 10th Baronet (1923–2013)
Sir Edward Geoffrey Lake, 11th Baronet (born 1928)

The heir apparent is the present holder's only son, Mark Winter Lake (born 1968).

Notes

References

External links
Sir Edward Lake's Interview with Charles I

Baronetcies in the Baronetage of Great Britain
Extinct baronetcies in the Baronetage of Ireland
1661 establishments in Ireland
1711 establishments in Great Britain